Aysh-ke-bah-ke-ko-zhay (or Aish-Ke-Vo-Go-Zhe, from Eshkibagikoonzhe, "[bird] having a leaf-green bill" in Anishinaabe language; also known as "Flat Mouth" (Gueule Platte), a nickname given by French fur traders) was a powerful Ojibwe chief who traveled to Washington, D.C. in 1855, along with Beshekee and other Ojibwa leaders, to negotiate the cession of ten million acres (40,000 km2) including the headwaters of the Mississippi in northern Minnesota.

Quotes 
"We are endlessly told to bury the war hatchet, and if we dig it up we are threatened with rods and ropes, or with being placed under the ground, we the Missinabes, the Eagles, the Bears [totems], free in our own forests... Thus the Americans plan to treat us as they treat their black people...I am not an animal. I am not like those in the East whom they call their children and whom they treat like three or six-year-olds, rod in their hand. They purchased their lands, and now they hold them prisoner and treat them as slaves."

— Eshkebugecoshe, head chief of the Pillager Band of Chippewa Indians, to French geographer Joseph Nicollet in the 1830s, speaking of his people's feelings that they were losing control of their lives

Notes

References
Schenck, Theresa M. William W. Warren: The Life, Letters, and Times of an Ojibwe Leader. Lincoln: University of Nebraska Press, 2007. .

Ojibwe people
Native American leaders
Native American history of Minnesota
People of pre-statehood Minnesota
19th-century Native Americans
Year of birth unknown
Year of death missing